Nasarawa State University is located in Keffi Nigeria.
Nassarawa State University, Keffi (NSUK), is a tertiary institution which was created to encourage the advancement of learning in the state and its neighbouring environment.

NSUK was established under the Nasarawa State Law No. 2 of 2001 as passed by the State House of Assembly under the first democratically elected Governor of Nasarawa State, Governor (Dr.) Abdullahi Adamu but was born and sited in February 2002, at the defunct College of Arts, Science and Technology (CAST), Keffi.

It was established with the fundamental aim of providing an avenue for Nassarawa State indigenes to pursue and acquire tertiary education. Located in Keffi town. Nassarawa State University caters for both full-time and part-time students.
The university has a Post Graduate Faculty which offers a Masters in Business Administration(MBA) under the department of Business Administration.

Campus 
The university has two campuses. The main campus is Keffi which is the administrative headquarters of the institution. The senate of the school, the governing body, the vice chancellor and all the senior members of the senate are at Keffi campus.  The second campus is in Lafia the state capital. The third one is located Pyanku which is then center for continuing studies and IJMB. The last campus is located at Gudi which basically house the propose faculty of Engineering

Faculties

Main campus (Keffi)

Administration 
 Business Administration
 Public Administration
 Accounting
 Banking and Finance
 Taxation
 Entrepreneurial Studies

Arts 
 History
 English Language
 Linguistic
 Religious Studies
 French Language
 Arabic Language
 Theater and Cultural Studies

Social Sciences 
 Mass Communication
 Political Science
 Economics
 Sociology
 Psychology

Natural and Applied Sciences 
 Biochemistry and Molecular Biology
 Physics
 Biological Sciences
 Chemistry 
 Geology and Mining
 Mathematical Sciences

Education 
 Arts and Social Sciences
 Educational Foundation
 Science Technology and Mathematics
 Special Education

Law 
 Private and Business Law
 Public and International Law

Environmental Science 
 Geography
 Urban and Regional Planning
 Environmental Management

Notable staff
Zaynab Alkali the writer, taught creative writing here.
Epiphany Azinge taught law
Terhemba Shija

Notable alumni
 Sani Abdullahi Shinkafi, Nigerian politician
 Hajiya Hama Ali Muhammad, Nigerian Public Administrator

References

ICT ENVIRONMENTAL SCIENCE
YAKUBU SANI YAKUBU

External links
 

 
2001 establishments in Nigeria
Educational institutions established in 2001